Middle Persian or Pahlavi, also known by its endonym Pārsīk or Pārsīg in its later form, is a Western Middle Iranian language which became the literary language of the Sasanian Empire. For some time after the Sasanian collapse, Middle Persian continued to function as a prestige language. It descended from Old Persian, the language of the Achaemenid Empire and is the linguistic ancestor of Modern Persian, an official language of Iran, Afghanistan (Dari) and Tajikistan (Tajik).

Name

"Middle Iranian" is the name given to the middle stage of development of the numerous Iranian languages and dialects. The middle stage of the Iranian languages begins around 450 BCE and ends around 650 CE. One of those Middle Iranian languages is Middle Persian, i.e. the middle stage of the language of the Persians, an Iranian people of Persia proper, which lies in the south-western highlands on the border with Babylonia. The Persians called their language Parsik, meaning "Persian".

Another Middle Iranian language was Parthian, i.e. the language of the northwestern Iranian peoples of Parthia proper, which lies along the southern/south-eastern edge of the Caspian sea and is adjacent to the boundary between western and eastern Iranian languages. The Parthians called their language Parthawik, meaning "Parthian". Via regular sound changes Parthawik became Pahlawik, from which the word 'Pahlavi' eventually evolved.  The -ik in parsik and parthawik was a regular Middle Iranian appurtenant suffix for "pertaining to". The New Persian equivalent of -ik is -i.

When the Arsacids (who were Parthians) came to power in the 3rd-century BCE, they inherited the use of written Greek (from the successors of Alexander the Great) as the language of government. Under the cultural influence of the Greeks (Hellenization), some Middle Iranian languages, such as Bactrian, also had begun to be written in Greek script. But yet other Middle Iranian languages began to be written in a script derived from Aramaic. This occurred primarily because written Aramaic had previously been the written language of government of the former Achaemenids, and the government scribes had carried that practice all over the empire. This practice had led to others adopting Imperial Aramaic as the language of communications, both between Iranians and non-Iranians, as well as between Iranians. The transition from Imperial Aramaic to Middle Iranian took place very slowly, with a slow increase of more and more Iranian words so that Aramaic with Iranian elements gradually changed into Iranian with Aramaic elements. Under Arsacid hegemony, this Aramaic-derived writing system for Iranian languages came to be associated with the Parthians in particular (it may have originated in the Parthian chancellories), and thus the writing system came to be called pahlavi "Parthian" too.

Aside from Parthian, Aramaic-derived writing was adopted for at least four other Middle Iranian languages, one of which was Middle Persian. In the 3rd-century CE, the Parthian Arsacids were overthrown by the Sassanids, who were natives of the south-west and thus spoke Middle Persian as their native language. Under Sassanid hegemony, the Middle Persian language became a prestige dialect and thus also came to be used by non-Persian Iranians. In the 7th-century, the Sassanids were overthrown by the Arabs. Under Arab influence, Iranian languages began to be written in Arabic script (adapted to Iranian phonology), while Middle Persian began to rapidly evolve into New Persian and the name parsik became Arabicized farsi. Not all Iranians were comfortable with these Arabic-influenced developments, in particular, members of the literate elite, which in Sassanid times consisted primarily of Zoroastrian priests. Those former elites vigorously rejected what they perceived as 'Un-Iranian', and continued to use the "old" language (i.e. Middle Persian) and Aramaic-derived writing system. In time, the name of the writing system, pahlavi "Parthian", began to be applied to the "old" Middle Persian language as well, thus distinguishing it from the "new" language, farsi. Consequently, 'pahlavi' came to denote the particularly Zoroastrian, exclusively written, late form of Middle Persian. Since almost all surviving Middle Persian literature is in this particular late form of exclusively written Zoroastrian Middle Persian, in popular imagination the term 'Pahlavi' became synonymous with Middle Persian itself.

The ISO 639 language code for Middle Persian is pal, which reflects the post-Sasanian era use of the term Pahlavi to refer to the language and not only the script.

Transition from Old Persian
In the classification of the Iranian languages, the Middle Period includes those languages which were common in Iran from the fall of the Achaemenid Empire in the fourth century BCE up to the fall of the Sasanian Empire in the seventh century CE.

The most important and distinct development in the structure of Iranian languages of this period is the transformation from the synthetic form of the Old Period (Old Persian and Avestan) to an analytic form:
 nouns, pronouns, and adjectives lost almost all of their case inflections 
 prepositions were used to indicate the different roles of words.
 many tenses began to be formed from a composite form
 the language developed a split ergative morphosyntactic alignment

Transition to New Persian
The modern-day descendants of Middle Persian are New Persian and Luri. The changes between late Middle and Early New Persian were very gradual, and in the 10th-11th centuries, Middle Persian texts were still intelligible to speakers of Early New Persian.  However, there are definite differences that had taken place already by the 10th century:

 sound changes, such as
the dropping of unstressed initial vowels
the epenthesis of vowels in initial consonant clusters
the loss of -g when word final
change of initial w- to either b- or gw- → g-
 changes in the verbal system, notably the loss of distinctive subjunctive and optative forms, and the increasing use of verbal prefixes to express verbal moods
 a transition from split ergative back to consistent nominative-accusative morphosyntactic alignment
 changes in the vocabulary, particularly the establishment of a superstratum or adstratum of Arabic loanwords replacing many Aramaic loans and native terms.
 the substitution of the Pahlavi script for the Arabic script

Surviving literature
Texts in Middle Persian are found in remnants of Sasanian inscriptions and Egyptian papyri, coins and seals, fragments of Manichaean writings, and Zoroastrian literature, most of which was written down after the Sasanian era. The language of Zoroastrian literature (and of the Sasanian inscriptions) is sometimes referred to as Pahlavi - a name that originally referred to the Pahlavi scripts, which were also the preferred writing system for several other Middle Iranian languages. Pahlavi Middle Persian is the language of quite a large body of literature which details the traditions and prescriptions of Zoroastrianism, which was the state religion of Sasanian Iran (224 to c. 650) before the Muslim conquest of Persia. The earliest texts in Zoroastrian Middle Persian were probably written down in late Sasanian times (6th–7th centuries), although they represent the codification of earlier oral tradition. However, most texts date from the ninth to the 11th century, when Middle Persian had long ceased to be a spoken language, so they reflect the state of affairs in living Middle Persian only indirectly. The surviving manuscripts are usually 14th-century copies. Other, less abundantly attested varieties are Manichaean Middle Persian, used for a sizable amount of Manichaean religious writings, including many theological texts, homilies and hymns (3rd–9th, possibly 13th century), and the Middle Persian of the Church of the East, evidenced in the Pahlavi Psalter (7th century); these were used until the beginning of the second millennium in many places in Central Asia, including Turpan and even localities in South India. All three differ minimally from one another and indeed the less ambiguous and archaizing scripts of the latter two have helped to elucidate some aspects of the Sasanian-era pronunciation of the former.

Phonology

Vowels

The vowels of Middle Persian were the following:

It has been doubted whether the Middle Persian short mid vowels /e/ and /o/ were phonemic, since they do not appear to have a unique continuation in later forms of Persian and no minimal pairs have been found. The evidence for them is variation between spelling with and without the matres lectionis y and w, as well as etymological considerations. They are thought to have arisen from earlier /a/ in certain conditions, including, for /e/, the presence of a following /n/, sibilant or front vowel in the next syllable, and for /o/, the presence of a following labial consonant or the vowel /u/ in the next syllable. Long /eː/ and /oː/ had appeared first in Middle Persian, since they had developed from the Old Persian diphthongs /ai/ and /aw/.

Consonants

The consonant phonemes were the following:

A major distinction between the pronunciation of the early Middle Persian of the Arsacid period (until the 3rd century CE) and the Middle Persian of the Sassanid period (3rd – 7th century CE) is due to a process of consonant lenition after voiced sounds that took place during the transition between the two. Its effects were as follows:

1. Voiced stops, when occurring after vowels, became semivowels: 
/b/ > /w/, /d/ > /j/, /g/ > /w/ or /j/ (the latter after /i/)

This process may have taken place very early, but it is nevertheless often the old pronunciation or a transitional one that is reflected in the Pahlavi spelling.

Old Persian naiba- > Middle Persian nēw (Pahlavi TB or nyw'), but:
Old Persian asabāra- > Middle Persian asvār 'horseman' (Pahlavi PLŠYA, ʾswblʾ).
Proto-Iranian *pād- > Middle Persian pāy 'foot' (Pahlavi LGLE, pʾd, Manichaean pʾy).
Old Persian magu- > Middle Persian mow- 'Magian' (Pahlavi mgw-).
Proto-Iranian *ni-gauš- > Middle Persian niyōš- 'listen' (Pahlavi nydwhš-, also nydwk(h)š-), Manichaean nywš).

2. Voiceless stops and affricates, when occurring after vowels as well as other voiced sounds, became voiced: 
/p/ > /b/, /t/ > /d/, /k/ > /g/, /t͡ʃ/ > /d͡ʒ/

This process is thought not to have been taken place before Sassanid Pahlavi, and it generally isn't reflected in Pahlavi spelling.

A further stage in this lenition process is expressed in a synchronic alternation: at least at some stage in late Middle Persian (later than the 3rd century), the consonants /b/, /d/, /g/ appear to have had, after vowels, the fricative allophones [β], [ð], [ɣ]. This is slightly more controversial for /g/, since there appears to have been a separate phoneme /ɣ/ as well. A parallel development seems to have affected /d͡ʒ/ in the same position, possibly earlier; not only was it weakened to a fricative [ʒ], but it was also depalatalised to [z]. In fact, old Persian [dʒ] and [ʒ] in any position also produced [z]. Unlike the case with the spirantisation of stops, this change is uncontroversially recognised for Sassanid times.

The lenition of voiceless stops and affricates remained largely unexpressed in Pahlavi spelling, which continues to reflect the Arsacid sound values, but is known from the more phonetic Manichaean spelling of texts from Sassanid times.

Arsacid šap > Sassanid šab (late [ʃaβ]) 'night' (Pahlavi LYLYA, šp'; Manichaean šb)

Arsacid pit > Sassanid pid (late [pið]) 'father' (Pahlavi AB, p(y)t', Manichaean pyd)

Arsacid pārak > Sassanid pārag (late [paːraɣ]) 'gift' (Pahlavi pʾlk')

Arsacid hač > Sassanid az 'from' (Pahlavi MN, hc, Manichaean ʾc or ʾz)

As a result of these changes, the voiceless stops and affricates /p/, /t/, /k/, /t͡ʃ/ rarely occurred after vowels – mostly when geminated, which has protected them from the lenition (e.g. waččag, sp. wck' 'child'), and due to some other sound changes.

Another difference between Arsacid and Sassanid-era pronunciation is that Arsacid word-initial /y/ produced Sassanid /d͡ʒ/ (another change that is not reflected in the Pahlavi spelling). The sound probably passed through the phase /ʒ/, which may have continued until very late Middle Persian, since Manichaean texts did not identify Indic /d͡ʒ/ with it and introduced a separate sign for the former instead of using the letter for their native sound. Nonetheless, word-initial /y/ was retained/reintroduced in learned borrowings from Avestan.

Arsacid yām > Sassanid ǰām 'glass' (Pahlavi yʾm, Manichaean jʾm); but:
Avestan yazata > Middle Persian yazd 'god' (Pahlavi yzdt')

Furthermore, some forms of Middle Persian appear to have preserved ǰ (from Proto-Iranian /d͡ʒ/ or /t͡ʃ/) after n due to Parthian influence, instead of the usual weakening to z. This pronunciation is reflected in Book Pahlavi, but not in Manichaean texts:

Proto-Iranian *panča > panǰ (spelt pnc in Book Pahlavi) or panz (spelt pnz in Manichaean)

Judging from the spelling, the consonant /θ/ may have been pronounced before /r/ in certain borrowings from Parthian in Arsacid times (unlike native words, which had /h/ for earlier *θ in general and /s/ for the cluster *θr in particular), but it had been replaced by /h/ by the Sassanid period:

Arsacid miθr > Sassanid mihr 'Mithra, contract' (Pahlavi mtr', Manichaean myhr).

The phoneme /ɣ/ (as opposed to the late allophone of /g/) is rare and occurs almost only in learned borrowings from Avestan and Parthian, e.g. moγ (Pahlavi mgw or mwg 'Magian'), maγ (Pahlavi mγ) 'hole, pit'.

The sound /ʒ/ may also have functioned as a marginal phoneme in borrowings as well.

The phoneme /l/ was still relatively rare as well, especially so in Manichaean texts, mostly resulting from Proto-Iranian *rd, *rz and, more rarely, *r. It also occurred in the combination /hl/, which was a reflex of Old Persian /rθ/ and /rs/ (cf. the words 'Pahlavi' and 'Parthian').

The sound /xw/ may be viewed as a phoneme or merely as a combination of /x/ and /w/.
Usually /x/, /xw/ and /ɣ/ are considered to have been velar; a less common view is that /x/ and /ɣ/ were uvular instead.

Finally, it may be pointed out that most scholars consider the phoneme /w/ as being still a labial approximant, but a few regard it as a voiced labial fricative /v/.

The initial clusters of /s/ and a stop (/sp-/, /st-/, /sk-/) had acquired a prosthetic vowel /i/ by the time of the Manichaean Middle Persian texts: istāyišn (ՙst՚yšn) 'praise' vs Pahlavi stāyišn (ՙst՚dšn') 'praise'.

Prosody

Stress was on the last syllable. That was due to the fact that any Old Persian post-stress syllables had been apocopated:

 Old Persian pati 'at' > Middle Persian pad
 Old Persian martiya- 'man' > Middle Persian mard
 Old Persian martiyā́nām 'man' (genitive-dative plural) > Middle Persian mardān

It has been suggested that words such as anīy 'other' (Pahlavi spelling AHRN, AHRNyd, Manichaean ՚ny) and mahīy 'bigger' (Manichaean mhy) may have been exceptionally stressed on the first syllable, since the last one was apocopated already in the course of the Middle Persian period: the later forms are an (Manichaean ՚n), and meh (Pahlavi ms and Manichaean myh); indeed, some scholars have reconstructed them as monosyllabic any, mahy even for Middle Persian.

Scripts

Middle Persian has been written in a number of different scripts. The corpora in different scripts also exhibit other linguistic differences that are partly due to their different ages, dialects and scribal traditions.

The Pahlavi scripts are abjads derived from the imperial variety of the Aramaic alphabet used in the chancelleries of the Achaemenid Empire. As is typical of abjads, they express primarily the consonants in a word form. What sets them apart from other abjads, however, is the use of Heterograms, and more specifically Aramaeograms, i.e. words written in Aramaic (sometimes, in later periods, with distortions) but pronounced in Middle Persian: e.g. LY (Aramaic 'to me') for man 'me, I'. There were about a thousand of these in the Book Pahlavi variety. In addition, their spelling remained very conservative, expressing the pronunciation of the Arsacid period. The two most important subvarieties are:

 Inscriptional Pahlavi, used in the inscriptions of Sassanid kings and officials from the 3rd-4th centuries CE. The 22 letters are written separately and still relatively well distinguished compared to later versions: the only formal coincidences of original Aramaic signs are the pair m and q and the triplet w, ʿ and r.
 Book Pahlavi, used primarily in Zoroastrian books from the 5th century CE on. Most texts are thought to reflect the stage of the language from the 6th to the 10th centuries CE. (6th-7th centuries for the translations of the Avesta and perhaps some didactic and entertainment literature, 9-10th centuries for the dogmatic and legal texts that form most of the corpus) This is the script that the overwhelming majority of Middle Persian texts is recorded in. A cursive script characterised by many ligatures and by the formal coincidence of originally different Aramaic letters, reducing the number to just 14 distinct signs. Now, also n coincides with the triplet w = ʿ = r, and in addition, another triplet g, d and y merges too, as does the pair ʾ and ḥ. Aramaic ṭ had also disappeared. In later times, some mergers were disambiguated by means of diacritic signs, following the example of the Arabic abjad: thus, g, d and y were distinguished again; however, this wasn't applied consistently.

Other known Pahlavi varieties are the early Pahlavi found in inscriptions on coins issued in the province of Pars from the 2nd century BC to the 3rd century CE; the relatively conservative Psalter Pahlavi (6th-8th centuries CE), used in a Christian Psalter fragment, which still retains all the letter distinctions that Inscriptional Pahlavi had except the one between t and ṭ; and the Pahlavi found in papyri from the early 7th century CE, which displays even more letter coincidences than Book Pahlavi.

The Manichaean script was an abjad introduced for the writing of Middle Persian by the prophet Mani (216-274 CE), who based it on his native variety of the Aramaic script of Palmyrene origin. Mani used this script to write the known book Šābuhrāgān and it continued to be used by Manichaeans until the 9th century to write in Middle Persian, and in various other Iranian languages for even longer. Specifically the Middle Persian Manichaean texts are numerous and thought to reflect mostly the period from the 3rd to the 7th centuries CE. In contrast to the Pahlavi scripts, it is a regular and unambiguous phonetic script that expresses clearly the pronunciation of 3rd century Middle Persian and distinguishes clearly between different letters and sounds, so it provides valuable evidence to modern linguists. Not only did not display any of the Pahlavi coalescences mentioned above, it also had special letters that enabled it to distinguish [p] and [f] (although it didn't always do so), as well as [y] and [d͡ʒ], unique designations for [β], [ð], and [ɣ], and consistent distinctions between the pairs [x] - [h] and [r] – [l].

Since knowledge of Pahlavi decreased after the Muslim conquest of Iran, the Zoroastrians occasionally transcribed their religious texts into other, more accessible or unambiguous scripts. One approach was to use the Avestan alphabet, a practice known as Pazand; another was to resort to the same Perso-Arabic script that was already being used for New Persian, and that was referred to as Pārsī. Since these methods were used at a relatively late linguistic stage, these transcriptions often reflect a very late pronunciation close to New Persian.

In general, Inscriptional Pahlavi texts have the most archaic linguistic features, Manichaean texts and the Psalter exhibit slightly later, but still relatively early language stages, and while the Pahlavi translations of the Avesta also retain some old features, most other Zoroastrian Book Pahlavi texts (which form the overwhelming majority of the Middle Persian corpus as a whole) are linguistically more innovative.

Transliteration and transcription

Transliteration of Pahlavi script

In view of the many ambiguities of the Pahlavi script, even its transliteration does not usually limit itself to rendering merely the letters as written; rather, letters are usually transliterated in accordance with their origin regardless of the coinciding forms: thus, even though Book Pahlavi has the same letter shapes for original n, w and r, for original ʾ and ḥ and for original d, g and y, besides having some ligatures that coincide in shape with certain individual letters, these are all transliterated differently. For instance, the spelling of gōspand 'domestic animal' is transliterated gwspnd in spite of the fact that the w and n have the same graphic appearance.

Furthermore, letters used as part of Aramaic heterograms and not intended to be interpreted phonetically are written in capitals: thus the heterogram for the word ān is rendered ZK, whereas its phonetic spelling is transliterated as ʾn' (the final vertical line reflects the so-called 'otiose' stroke, see below). Finally, there is a convention of representing 'distorted/corrupt' letters, which 'should' have appeared in a different shape from a historical point of view, by under- or overlining them: e.g. the heterogram for andar 'in' is transliterated BYN, since it corresponds to Aramaic byn, but the sign that 'should' have been b actually looks like a g.

Within Arameograms, scholars have traditionally used the standard Semitological designations of the Aramaic (and generally Semitic) letters, and these include a large number of diacritics and special signs expressing the different Semitic phonemes, which were not distinguished in Middle Persian. In order to reduce the need for these, a different system was introduced by D. N. McKenzie, which dispenses with diacritics as much as possible, often replacing them with vowel letters: A for ʾ, O for ʿ, E for H, H for Ḥ, C for Ṣ, for example ORHYA for ʿRḤYʾ (bay 'god, majesty, lord'). For ''ṭ'', which still occurs in heterograms in Inscriptional Pahlavi, Θ may be used. Within Iranian words, however, both systems use c for original Aramaic ṣ and h for original Aramaic ḥ, in accordance with their Iranian pronunciation (see below). The letter l, when modified with a special horizontal stroke that shows that the pronunciation is /l/ and not /r/, is rendered in the McKenzie system as ɫ. The traditional system continues to be used by many, especially European scholars. The MacKenzie system is the one used in this article.

Transliteration of Manichaean script

As for Pahlavi, c is used for the transliteration of original Aramaic ṣ and h for the transliteration of original ḥ. Original Aramaic h, on the other hand, is sometimes rendered as ẖ. For original ṭ, the sign ṯ is used. The special Manichaean letters for /x/, /f/, [β], /ɣ/ and [ð] are transcribed in accordance with their pronunciation as x, f, β, γ and δ.
Unlike Pahlavi, the Manichaean script uses the letter Ayin also in Iranian words (see below) and it is transliterated in the usual Semitological way as ՙ.

Transcription

Since, like most abjads, even the Manichaean script and a maximally disambiguated transliterated form of Pahlavi do not provide exhaustive information about the phonemic structure of Middle Persian words, a system of transcription is also necessary. There are two traditions of transcription of Pahlavi Middle Persian texts: one closer to the spelling and reflecting the Arsacid-era pronunciation, as used by Ch. Bartholomae and H. S. Nyberg (1964) and a currently more popular one reflecting the Sassanid era pronunciation, as used by C. Saleman, W. B. Henning and, in a somewhat revised form, by D. N. MacKenzie (1986).

The less obvious features of the usual transcription are:

 long vowels are marked with a macron: ā, ē, ī, ō, ū for /aː/, /eː/, /iː/, /oː/, /uː/. 
 The semivowels are marked as follows: w for /w/ and y for /j/. 
 The palatal obstruents are marked with carons as follows: š for /ʃ/, č for /t͡ʃ/, ǰ for /d͡ʒ/ and ž for /ʒ/. 
 The voiceless velar fricative /x/ is marked as x, its labialised counterpart /xw/ is xw, and the (phonemic) voiced velar fricative /ɣ/ is γ.

Spelling

A common feature of Pahlavi as well as Manichaean spelling was that the Aramaic letters ṣ and ḥ were adapted to express the sounds /t͡ʃ/ and /h/, respectively. In addition, both could use the letter p to express /f/, and ṣ to express z after a vowel.

Pahlavi

Arameograms

The widespread use of Aramaeograms in Pahlavi, often existing in parallel with 'phonetic' spellings, has already been mentioned: thus, the same word hašt 'eight' can be spelt hšt or TWMNYA. A curious feature of the system is that simple word stems sometimes have spellings derived from Aramaic inflected forms: the spellings of verb stems include Aramaic inflectional affixes such as -WN, -TWN or -N and Y-; the spellings of pronouns are often derived from Aramaic prepositional phrases (tо̄ 'you' is LK, originally Aramaic lk 'to you', о̄y 'he' is OLE, originally Aramaic ʿlh 'onto him'); and inalienable nouns are often noun phrases with pronominal modifiers (pidar 'father' is ABYtl, originally Aramaic ʾby 'my father', pāy 'foot' is LGLE, originally Aramaic rglh 'his foot'). Furthermore, the Aramaic distinctions between ḥ and h and between k and q were not always maintained, with the first often replacing the second, and the one between t and ṭ was lost in all but Inscriptional Pahlavi: thus YKTLWN (pronounced о̄zadan) for Aramaic yqṭlwn 'kill', and YHWWN (pronounced būdan) for Aramaic yhwwn 'be', even though Aramaic h is elsewhere rendered E. In the rest of this article, the Pahlavi spellings will be indicated due to their unpredictability, and the Aramaeograms will be given priority over the 'phonetic' alternatives for the same reason.

If a word expressed by an Arameogram has a grammatical ending or, in many cases, a word-formation suffix, these are generally expressed by phonetic elements: LYLYAʾn for šabʾn 'nights'. However, verbs in Inscriptional Pahlavi are sometimes written as 'bare ideograms', whose interpretation is a major difficulty for scholars.

Historical and ambiguous spelling

It has also been pointed out that the Pahlavi spelling does not express the 3rd century lenitions, so the letters p, t, k and c express /b/, /d/, /g/ and /z/ after vowels, e.g. šp' for šab 'night' and hc for az 'from'. The rare phoneme /ɣ/ was also expressed by the same letter shape as k (however, this sound value is usually expressed in the transliteration). Similarly, the letter d may stand for /y/ after a vowel, e.g. pʾd for pāy 'foot' – this is no longer apparent in Book Pahlavi due to the coincidence of the shapes of the original letters y, d and g, but is already clearly seen in Inscriptional and Psalter Pahlavi. Indeed, it even appears to have been the general rule word-finally, regardless of the word's origins, although modern transliterations of words like xwadāy (xwtʾd) and mēnōy  (mynwd) do not always reflect this analogical / pseudo-historical spelling. Final īy was regularly written yd. In the same way, (w)b may also correspond to a w in the pronunciation after a vowel. The fortition of initial /y/ to /d͡ʒ/ (or /ʒ/) is not reflected either, so y can express initial /d͡ʒ/, e.g. yʾm for ǰām 'glass' (while it still expresses /j/ in the learned word yzdt' for yazd 'god'.

Some even earlier sound changes are not consistently reflected either, such as the transition of /θ/ to /h/ in some words (in front of /r/ this reflex is due to Parthian influence, since the Middle Persian reflex should have been /s/). In such words, the spelling may have s or, in front of r – t. For example, gāh 'place, time' is spelt gʾs (cf. Old Persian gāθu) and nigāh '(a) look' is spelt nkʾs; šahr 'country, town' is spelt štr' (cf. Avestan xsaθra) and mihr 'Mithra, contract, friendship is spelt mtr'. In contrast, the Manichaean spellings are gʾh, ngʾh, šhr, myhr. Some other words with earlier /θ/ are spelt phonetically in Pahlavi, too: e.g. gēhān gyhʾn 'material world', čihr cyhl 'face'. There are also some other cases where /h/ is spelt /t/ after p: ptwnd for paywand 'connection', and /t/ may also stand for /y/ in that position: ptkʾl for pahikār 'strife'.

There are some other phoneme pairs besides /y/ and /d͡ʒ/ that are not distinguished: h (the original Aramaic ḥ) may stand either for /h/ or for /x/ (hm for ham 'also' as well as hl for xar 'donkey'), whereas the use of original Aramaic h is restricted to heterograms (transliterated E in McKenzie's system, e.g. LGLE for pāy 'foot'). Not only /p/, but also the frequent sound /f/ is expressed by the letter p, e.g. plhw' for farrox 'fortunate'. While the original letter r is retained in some words as an expression of the sound /r/, especially in older frequent words and Aramaeograms (e.g. štr' for šahr 'country, town', BRTE for duxt 'daughter'), it is far more common for the letter l to have that function, as in the example plhw' for farrox. In the relatively rare cases where l does express /l/, it can be marked as ɫ.

Expression of vowels

Like many abjads, the system may express not only consonants, but also some vowels by means of certain consonant signs, the so-called matres lectionis. This is usually limited to long vowels: thus, original  ʾ can stand for the vowel /aː/ (e.g. in pʾd for pād), y can stand for /iː/ and /eː/ (e.g.pym for pīm 'pain' and nym for nēm 'half'), and w can stand for /uː/ or /oː/ (swt' for sūd 'profit' and swl for sōr 'salty'). However, short /u/ is also typically expressed like long /uː/ (e.g. swd for suy 'hunger'), whereas short /i/ and the assumed /e/ and /o/ vary between being expressed like their long counterparts or remaining unexpressed: p(y)t for pid 'father', sl(y)šk for srešk 'tear', nhwm for nohom 'ninth'. Due to elision of /w/, written yw can also correspond to /eː/: nywk' 'good'. Gemination of consonants was not expressed, e.g. waččag, sp. wck' 'child').

In Inscriptional and Psalter Pahlavi, a -y that was not pronounced appears word-finally, e.g. šhpwhry for Šahpuhr. Its origin and function are disputed. In Book Pahlavi, it developed into a peculiar convention, the so-called 'otiose' stroke, which resembles w/n/r and is added to demarcate the end of the word after those letters that never connect to the left: mān' 'house'.

Like many abjads, Pahlavi ʾ can express simply the fact that a word begins in a vowel, e.g. ʾp̄ʾyt' for abāyēd 'it is necessary' (though two alephs usually aren't written in a row to express an initial long vowel).

Manichaean

In contrast to the historical and ideographic features of Pahlavi, Manichaean spelling is relatively straightforward. Like Pahlavi, the Manichaean script designates vowel-initial words with ʾ, but a further spelling convention in it is that it is the letter ՙ, rather than ʾ, that is written before initial front vowels, e.g. ՙym for im 'this' (in contrast to Pahlavi ʾm (or LZNE). Vowels are marked by matres lectionis in the Manichaean script in the usual way, and long vowels are more likely to be marked.

In spite of the availability of signs for each sound, Manichaean spelling did not always make perfectly phonetic use of them. In particular, not only in Pahlavi but even in Manichaean, the letter p was often used to express /f/, and /z/ after vowels was written etymologically as c: thus, frāz 'forth' was spelt prʾc, just as in Pahlavi. If the voiced fricatives really occurred as allopohones of /b/, /g/, /d/ in Middle Persian, the special Manichaean signs for fricatives β, γ and δ usually were not used to express this either. Conversely, the Semitic letters for the consonants q, ṭ and h (transliterated ẖ in Manichaean) were retained and used, occasionally, even though they only expressed the same Middle Persian sounds as k and t, and ḥ (transliterated h in Manichaean). The Manichaean script also has abbreviation marking double dots for the forms ʾwd 'and', ʾw-š 'and he' and ʾw-šʾn 'and they', which may be transcribed as ẅ, š̈ and š̈ʾn. Elisions and plural may also be marked with double dots.

Grammar

The elision of unstressed word-final syllables during the transition from Old to Middle Persian has eliminated many grammatical endings. As a result, compared to the synthetic grammar of Old Persian, Middle Persian belongs to a much more analytic language type, with relatively little inflection and widespread expression of grammatical meanings through syntactic means instead (specifically, use of prepositions and periphrases).

Nominal morphology

Case and number inflection

Early Middle Persian inflection as found in the Sassanid rock inscriptions (3rd-4th centuries CE) still retained a minimal case system for the nominal parts of speech, i.e. nouns, adjectives, pronouns and numerals. It included a direct or subject case (originating from the old nominative) used for the subject and the predicative nominal and an oblique case used for other functions (indirect object, genitive possessor, complement of a preposition, subject/'agent' of the ergative construction). The case distinction was only present in the plural of nouns, in nouns of relationship (family terms) that end in -tar or -dar in the oblique, and in the first person singular pronoun az/an (ANE). The attested system is shown in the table below, using the words mard (GBRA) 'man', pid (AB') 'father' as examples.

Samples

A sample of Inscriptional Middle Persian: Kartir's inscription (Kartir KZ 1) on the Ka'ba-ye Zartosht

A sample of Manichaean Middle Persian: excerpt from the Shābuhragān

A sample of Psalter Pahlavi Middle Persian: Psalm 129

A sample of Book Pahlavi Middle Persian (historical narrative): Beginning of The Book of Ardā Wirāz

A sample of Book Pahlavi Middle Persian (legendary narrative): an excerpt from the Lesser Bundahišn

Sample of Book Pahlavi Middle Persian (theological discourse): excerpt from the Lesser Bundahišn 2

Poetry
A sample Middle Persian poem from manuscript of Jamasp Asana:

Vocabulary

Affixes
There are a number of affixes in Middle Persian that did not survive into Modern Persian:

Location suffixes

Comparison of Middle Persian and Modern Persian vocabulary

There are a number of phonological differences between Middle Persian and New Persian. The long vowels of Middle Persian did not survive in many present-day dialects. Also, initial consonant clusters were very common in Middle Persian (e.g.  spās "thanks"). However, New Persian does not allow initial consonant clusters, whereas final consonant clusters are common (e.g.  asb "horse").

1 Since many long vowels of Middle Persian did not survive, a number of homophones were created in New Persian. For example, šir and šer, meaning "milk" and "lion", respectively, are now both pronounced šir. In this case, the correct pronunciation has been preserved in Kurdish and Tajiki.

Middle Persian cognates in other languages

There is a number of Persian loanwords in English, many of which can be traced to Middle Persian. The lexicon of Classical Arabic also contains many borrowings from Middle Persian. In such borrowings Iranian consonants that sound foreign to Arabic, g, č, p, and ž, have been replaced by q/k, j, š, f/b, and s/z. The exact Arabic renderings of the suffixes -ik/-ig and -ak/-ag is often used to deduce the different periods of borrowing. The following is a parallel word list of cognates:

Comparison of Middle Persian and Modern Persian names

See also
Avestan
Old Persian
New Persian
Parthian language
Persian language
Persian language#History
Middle Persian literature

References

Bibliography

 MacKenzie, D. N. 1986. A concise Pahlavi dictionary. London: OUP
 Maggi, Mauro and Paola Orsatti. 2018. From Old to New Persian. In: The Oxford Handbook of Persian Linguistics. P. 7-52
 Nyberg, H. S. (1964): A Manual of Pahlavi I – Texts, Alphabets, Index, Paradigms, Notes and an Introduction, Wiesbaden: Harrassowitz.
 Skjærvø, Prods Oktor. 1997. On the Middle Persian Imperfect. In Syntaxe des Langues Indoiraniennes anciennes, ed. E. Pirart, AuOrSup 6 (Barcelona), 161–88.
 Skjærvø, Prods Oktor. 2007. Introduction to Pahlavi. Cambridge, Mass.
 Skjærvø, Prods Oktor. 2009. Middle West Iranian. In Gernot Windfuhr (ed.), The Iranian Languages, 196–278. London & New York: Routledge.
 Sundermann, Werner. 1989. Mittelpersisch. In: Compendium Linguarum Iranicarum. Herausgegeben von Rudiger Schmidt. Wiesbaden: Dr. Ludwig Reichert Verlag. P. 138–165.
 Расторгуева, В. С. 1966. Среднеперсидский язык. Москва: Издательство "Наука"
 Расторгуева, В. С., Е. К. Молчанова. 1981. Среднеперсидский язык. In: Основы иранского языкознания, т. 2. Москва: Издательство "Наука". P. 6-146

External links

 Lessons in Pahlavi-Pazend by S.D.Bharuchī and E.S.D.Bharucha (1908) at the Internet Archive – Part 1 and 2
 Middle Persian texts on TITUS
 Scholar Raham Asha's website, including many Middle Persian texts in original and translation
 An organization promoting the revival of Middle Persian as a literary and spoken language (contains a grammar and lessons)
 
 Introduction to Pahlavi by Prods Oktor Skjærvø (archived 2 November 2012)
 Pahlavica: An online dictionary of Zoroastrian Middle Persian

 
History of the Persian language
Languages attested from the 3rd century BC
Languages extinct in the 11th century
Extinct languages of Asia
Extinct languages of Europe
Medieval languages